Reckless is a 1984 American romantic drama film starring Aidan Quinn and Daryl Hannah. The film was directed by James Foley and written by Chris Columbus, in their directing and screenwriting debuts respectively. The film's soundtrack included music by Kim Wilde, INXS, Romeo Void, Bob Seger and Thomas Newman. It was shot in the Appalachian Mountains and Rust Belt of Steubenville, Ohio, Weirton, West Virginia and Mingo Junction, Ohio.

Plot
Teenage outcast and football player Johnny Rourke (Aidan Quinn) falls for upper-class cheerleader Tracey Prescott (Daryl Hannah). She's officially dating his teammate Randy Daniels (Adam Baldwin). A random draw at the high school 'Tin Can-Can' dance pairs Johnny and Tracey.

Worlds collide and opposites attract as they connect on the dance floor. Jealous Randy picks a fight with Johnny, the coach intervenes, and Johnny leaves in a huff. Tracey follows, and he offers to take her out on his motorbike. He shows her his lookout spot, and they talk about their future plans.

The next day at school Johnny gets a call from the mill, as his dad is too drunk. It causes him to be late to practice, so the coach berates him. When he doesn't divulge why, he's kicked off the team. Arriving home in a belligerent mood, he argues with his dad, who smashes his stereo and throws him out.

At home, Tracey talks to her mom lamenting that she's considered to be the perfect daughter. She tears out of her drive and down the road. Johnny detects her inquietude, follows closely, then he gets her to stop so he can man her car.

They sneak into the high school. Reading his file as anti-social and potentially dangerous since his mother's abandonment, Johnny and Tracey go on a rampage. They strew file contents throughout the halls, freeing the animals and creatures in biology, smash trophy cases, strip and jump into the pool, where he kisses her, Finding the place he's been sleeping, they finally are intimate.

Johnny wakes up alone, so he seeks Tracey out at her house, as she's meant to be alone for the weekend. He pushes his way in, and although she weakly resists at first, she caves in. They are woken up in her parents room by her younger brother Davey, who explains her family came back early. He helps sneak Johnny out.

At the pep rally that night, Johnny asks to speak to her. She arrives very late to his look out. He reiterates how he needs to leave, unintentionally scaring her. For a few days she avoids him at school. He gets called in to the factory again, but this time to clear out his dad's locker.

After the funeral, which Tracey attends from afar, Johnny tries to go through his dad's things. Finding keepsakes of his mother who abandoned them, he sets fire to them and the whole place.  
 
Hopes dashed, future prospects dim and the omnipresent American Steel mill looming large in the background of this one-industry-town, Rourke comes to grips with his estranged mother and recently deceased father (Kenneth McMillan).

Johnny turns up to the careers fair, wanting to speak alone with Tracey. She is forced to decide between her stable longtime boyfriend Randy and Rourke. Johnny declares his love for her, and they drive off together on his motorcycle to Davey's cheers.

Cast
 Aidan Quinn - Johnny Rourke
 Daryl Hannah - Tracey Prescott
 Kenneth McMillan - John Rourke Sr.
 Cliff DeYoung - Coach Barton
 Lois Smith - Mrs. Prescott
 Adam Baldwin - Randy Daniels
 Dan Hedaya - Peter Daniels
 Billy Jayne - David Prescott
 Adam LeFevre - Officer Haskell
 Toni Kalem - Donna
 Jennifer Grey - Cathy Bennario
 Haviland Morris - Mary Pat Sykes
 Pamela Springsteen - Karen Sybern

Reception
On review aggregator Rotten Tomatoes, Reckless holds a 0% based on 5 reviews, with an average rating of 4.25/10.

While on the film podcast The Movie Crypt, screenwriter Chris Columbus disowned the film and claimed that director James Foley had "destroyed his material". Columbus claimed he was banned from the set by Foley, and cried after the first screening.

References

External links
 
 
 
 
 
 Reckless at Trailers from Hell
 

1984 films
American romantic drama films
1984 romantic drama films
Metro-Goldwyn-Mayer films
Films directed by James Foley
Films shot in Ohio
Films shot in West Virginia
Films scored by Thomas Newman
Films produced by Scott Rudin
Films with screenplays by Chris Columbus
1984 directorial debut films
1980s English-language films
1980s American films